Bresse is an area and former province in eastern France.

Bresse may also refer to:
 The Bresse Gauloise breed of chicken, which within the area of Bresse is known as "Bresse"
 The poulet de Bresse, an appellation d'origine contrôlée chicken product derived from the above
 Bresse Bleu or Bleu de Bresse, a blue cheese from the area
 Jacques Antoine Charles Bresse, French civil engineer

Places
 La Bresse, a commune in the Vosges department in France
 Bresse-sur-Grosne, a commune in the Saône-et-Loire department in France